Charles Oluwafunsho Fadesere (born 31 August 1990), better known by his stage name Greatness Jones is a British record producer, composer and songwriter of Nigerian descent. He was known legally as Charles Oluwafunsho Nnaji. It was not until March 2019 when Charles legally adopted his Mother's last name, which was finalized in April 2019.
He has worked with British hip-hop artists such as Giggs, Avelino, Scorcher and more.

Background
Charles was born on 31 August 1990 in Hackney, London to Nigerian parents. His Mother is of the Yoruba and his father is of the Igbo ethnic group of Nigeria. His Mother came to the United Kingdom in the mid 1980s. He graduated from Cardinal Pole RC School in Hackney, London in 2006 and went to study Business and Information systems at University of Hertfordshire in 2008.

Music career
Greatness Jones' production career began in the UK, where he worked with some of the most relevant artists in the music scene. It was on a vacation to New York City where he met a few up and coming and household name rappers such as Bynoe & Nas' Mass Appeal signee Dave East. After returning to the UK Greatness Jones maintained relationships he had established in New York City and started to send music to musicians he had met. As a result, songs produced by Greatness Jones started receiving radio play on stations such as Hot 97 & Power 105.1. He also landed a track on DJ Whoo Kid's 'The Elevation Vol. 2' Mixtape, track entitled 'Roll Up' by Dave East.

Production style
Greatness uses the music production software Logic Pro along with custom plug-ins to make his beats. He usually produces space like mystic mellow beats which are distinguished by their hard-hitting sound and the use of heavy basslines, 808 kicks and sped up hi-hats.

Discography

2014
PW – From London With Love
02 – Cause Me Pain

DJ Whoo Kid – The Elevation Vol. 2
13 – Roll Up – Dave East

Scorcher – 1 of 1
04 – Lord
07 – Smoking While We Drink

2015
Mark Asari – Good One Single
01 – Good One Ft. Giggs

2016
Bonkaz – Mixtape of The Year
05 – I Actually Freestyled This :)

Giggs – Landlord
05 – The Process

Avelino 
01 – Late Nights in the 15

References

1990 births
Living people
People from Hackney Central
Black British musicians
British Nigerian
Southern hip hop musicians
English people of Nigerian descent
English record producers
English people of Yoruba descent
English people of Igbo descent
Igbo musicians
Yoruba musicians
Alumni of the University of Hertfordshire